Olia (Odia: ଓଳିଆ) is a closed vessel made up of straw or bamboo. Traditionally it is used to store rice and other corns. It is used in different tribal areas of Odisha and other states of India.

Construction 

First ropes are made by the straw. The ropes are tightened in such a way that it looks like round shaped and called as a Mora. Lapping one mora above another makes a round shaped vessel.

References

Odisha
Food storage
Bamboo weaving
Straw art